Mariya Slokotovich (born 16 January 1989) is a road cyclist from Kazakhstan. She represented her nation at the 2008 UCI Road World Championships.

References

External links
 profile at Procyclingstats.com

1989 births
Kazakhstani female cyclists
Living people
Place of birth missing (living people)
21st-century Kazakhstani women